The Royal Teens were an American rock and roll band that formed in New Jersey in 1956 and originally consisted of Bob Gaudio on piano, Tom Austin on drums, Billy Dalton on guitar, and Billy Crandall on saxophone. The group is best known for its single "Short Shorts", which was a number 3 hit in the United States in 1958. The follow-up single, 1959's "Believe Me", hit number 26. They never recorded an album, and broke up in 1965.

History
The term "Short Shorts" in the song referred specifically to very short cutoff jeans as worn by teenage girls. The term appears to have originated with Bob Gaudio and Tom Austin. According to the group's website, they coined the term in 1957, and hit on using it as a song theme and title that summer when they saw two girls in cutoffs leaving a local teen spot.

Originally, the group's name was simply "The Royals", but they were persuaded to add the word "Teens" in order to avoid having the same name as an existing band. The performers on the 1957 Bell Sound Studios recording were Bob Gaudio (piano), Tom Austin (drums and whistle effect), Billy Dalton (guitar), Billy Crandall (sax and vocal effect), and Diana Lee (a female vocalist working for Leo Rogers). The record was originally released on a private label, Power Records. The song's instant popularity led the label owner to license the production to ABC-Paramount Records. It reached number 3 on the list later known as the Billboard Hot 100.

The group undertook a tour. The sax player, Billy Crandall, age 14, was not allowed by his parents to tour with the group, and was replaced by Larry Qualiano. One of the other members had already graduated, and the other two took time off from high school. Some of their touring companions included Buddy Holly, Sam Cooke, Jackie Wilson, Jerry Lee Lewis, Bo Diddley, Chuck Berry, and Frankie Avalon.

Legacy
Bob Gaudio later became a member of the Four Seasons. Fourteen-year-old member Al Kooper sometimes appeared with the Royal Teens on the road in 1959, and later founded the groups The Blues Project and Blood Sweat & Tears. Kooper also performed as a session musician on several of Bob Dylan's albums in the mid-1960s. Vocalist Joe Francavilla (also known as Joey Villa) joined the group in late 1958. He previously sang with the Three Friends, which had a minor hit with "Blanche". With several briefly tenured members of the Royal Teens, he went on to form Joey and the Twisters, which released a few minor hits ("Do You Want to Dance", "Bony Maronie") in 1961–1962 and frequently played the Peppermint Lounge in New York City as contemporaries of Joey Dee and the Starliters. Billy Crandall joined the Knickerbockers in 1964, using the name Buddy Randell, and sang lead vocal on the group's top-20 hit "Lies" in 1966. Crandall later performed with the contemporary Messianic group, Jerusalem Rivers, before dying in 1998.

The song "Short Shorts" was used in commercials for Nair in the 1970s, sparking interest in the group, and is now used in Japan for the opening tune of Tamori Club on TV Asahi Corporation.

When the show Jersey Boys came to Broadway, Bob Gaudio told Tommy that "Short Shorts" was being featured in the show. When the two original Royal Teens reunited at the August Wilson Theater the night of the premiere of Jersey Boys, Austin said he was so proud to have traveled the first leg of Gaudio's historical musical journey with him.

Billy Dalton died of an apparent heart attack on Saturday, October 8, 2011. After his funeral Mass, he was interred in St. Patrick Cemetery in Rochelle, Illinois, on October 13, 2011 — which would have been his 71st birthday.

Discography

ABC Paramount Records
 1958: "Short Shorts" / "Planet Rock" (originally issued on the tiny Power Records label)
 1958: "Big Name Button" / "Sham Rock"
 1958: "Harvey's Got A Girlfriend" / "Hangin' Around"
 1958: "Open The Door" / "My Kind of Dream"

Power Records
 1959: "Sittin With My Baby" / "Mad Gass"

Mighty Records
 1959: "Leotards" / "Royal Blue"

Capitol Records
 1959: "Believe Me" / "Little Cricket"
 1960: "The Moon's Not Meant For Lovers (Anymore)" / "Was It A Dream?"
 1960: "It's The Talk of the Town" / "With You"

See also
1956 in music
Shorts#Styles

References

External links
 Official website
 Doo-wop.blogg.org
 Ungerhorner.com

Rock music groups from New Jersey
Royal Teens, The
Musical groups established in 1956
Musical groups disestablished in 1965
Capitol Records artists
RCA Records artists
Epic Records artists
Rock and roll music groups
1956 establishments in New Jersey